Socialism in Estonia was practiced in Soviet Estonia during the Soviet Occupation of Estonia.

One of the only political parties in Estonia to follow some form of Socialism was the Estonian Left Party.

See also
History of Estonia
Left-wing politics
List of political parties in Estonia
Politics of Estonia

References

 
Estonia